The fourth round of the women's points race of the 2007–08 UCI Track Cycling World Cup Classics took place in Copenhagen, Denmark on 16 February 2008. 45 athletes participated in the contest.

Competition format
A points race is a race in which all riders start together and the object is to earn points during sprints or to lap the bunch.

The tournament consisted of two qualifying heats of 10 km (40 laps). The top twelve cyclist of each heat advanced to the 20 km final (80 laps).

Schedule
Saturday 16 February
12:35-12:55 Qualifying, heat 1
12:55-13:15 Qualifying, heat 2
16:10-14:40 Final
14:50-14:55 Victory Ceremony

Schedule from Tissottiming.com

Results

Qualifying

Qualifying Heat 1

Results from Tissottiming.com.

Qualifying Heat 2

Results from Tissottiming.com.

Final

Results from Tissottiming.com.

World Cup Standings
Final standings after 4 of 4 2007–08 World Cup races.

Results from Tissottiming.com.

See also
 2007–08 UCI Track Cycling World Cup Classics – Round 4 – Women's individual pursuit
 2007–08 UCI Track Cycling World Cup Classics – Round 4 – Women's scratch
 2007–08 UCI Track Cycling World Cup Classics – Round 4 – Women's team pursuit
 UCI Track Cycling World Cup Classics – Women's points race

References

2007–08 UCI Track Cycling World Cup Classics
2008 in Danish sport
UCI Track Cycling World Cup – Women's points race